Estola kuscheli is a species of beetle in the family Cerambycidae. It was described by Juan Barriga, Tomás Moore, and Danilo Cepeda in 2005. It is known from Chile.

References

Estola
Beetles described in 2005
Beetles of South America
Endemic fauna of Chile